The United Nations Educational, Scientific and Cultural Organization (UNESCO) World Heritage Sites are places of importance to cultural or natural heritage as described in the UNESCO World Heritage Convention, established in 1972. Cultural heritage consists of monuments (such as architectural works, monumental sculptures, or inscriptions), groups of buildings, and sites (including archaeological sites). Natural features (consisting of physical and biological formations), geological and physiographical formations (including habitats of threatened species of animals and plants), and natural sites which are important from the point of view of science, conservation or natural beauty, are defined as natural heritage. The Soviet Union ratified the convention on 12 October 1988. The first five sites in the Soviet Union were inscribed to the list at the 14th session of the UNESCO World Heritage Committee, held in Banff, Alberta, Canada, in December 1990. Of these five, three are located in the present-day Russian Federation (or Russia): the monuments of Saint Petersburg (then called Leningrad), Kizhi Pogost, and Moscow Kremlin and Red Square. 

, there are 30 World Heritage Sites in Russia, with a further 28 sites on the tentative list. The most recent site listed was the Petroglyphs of Lake Onega and the White Sea, in 2021. There are nineteen cultural sites and eleven natural. Four sites are transnational. The Curonian Spit is shared with Lithuania, the Landscapes of Dauria and Uvs Nuur Basin are shared with Mongolia, and the Struve Geodetic Arc is shared with nine European countries.



World Heritage Sites 
UNESCO lists sites under ten criteria; each entry must meet at least one of the criteria. Criteria i through vi are cultural, and vii through x are natural.

Tentative sites
In addition to sites inscribed on the World Heritage List, member states can maintain a list of tentative sites that they may consider for nomination. Nominations for the World Heritage List are only accepted if the site was previously listed on the tentative list. , Russia recorded 28 sites on its tentative list.

See also
List of World Heritage Sites in the Soviet Union
Tourism in Russia

References

Russia
Russian culture
World Heritage Sites